is a private university with campuses in Okazaki, Aichi and Toyota, Aichi, Japan. The school was established in 1966 as a women's college. Later it became co-educational.

External links
 Official website 

Educational institutions established in 1966
Private universities and colleges in Japan
Aichi Gakusen University
1966 establishments in Japan
Okazaki, Aichi
Toyota, Aichi